Berenene dor Ocmore, Empress of Namorn, is the title character in the young adult fantasy novel The Will of the Empress by Tamora Pierce. Based upon the Russian Empress Catherine the Great and Elizabeth I, Berenene serves as an antagonist to the book's four protagonists, and especially Sandrilene fa Toren.

Relationships with the other characters

Sandry

Sandry and Berenene are cousins, related through Sandry's mother, Amiliane fa Landreg, a Namornese noble and Clehame of fief Landreg. Since Amiliane's marriage to Sandry's father, a lesser Emelanese noble, the money from the Landreg estate had been syphoned out of Namorn, first to Amiliane and then to Sandry.

In the opening to The Will of the Empress, Sandry reviews her account books and realizes that the Imperial taxes on her estate have been growing every year; it is Berenene's way of reinforcing her standing invitation for her cousin to visit the Imperial Court in Dancruan. Once she arrives, it is the Empress's mission to keep her and her money in Namorn, despite Sandry's continual statements that she makes her home in Emelan.

Briar

Briar comes to Namorn with Sandry, and Berenene takes a special interest in him as he is a plant mage and Berenene has an interest in gardening.  She grants him special permission to do what he likes in her personal gardens, and tries to get him to stay in Namorn by offering him the post of imperial gardener.  She appears uncharacteristically fond of him - "She feared she had lost the young man's regard, or worse, his friendship".

References

See also

 The Will of the Empress
 Sandrilene fa Toren
 Briar Moss
 Emelan
 Tamora Pierce

Emelanese characters
Fictional emperors and empresses